Ruslan Vladimirovich Murashkin (born 30 April 1989) is a former Russian professional football player.

Club career
He played in the Russian Football National League for FC Spartak-MZhK Ryazan in 2007.

External links
 
 Career summary by sportbox.ru
 

1989 births
People from Shemonaikha District
Living people
Russian footballers
Association football midfielders
FC Spartak-MZhK Ryazan players